Chetna Pande is an Indian actress and model who is known for her role of Jenny in Dilwale and as a contestant in Ace of Space 1 and Fear Factor: Khatron Ke Khiladi 12 respectively.

Career
Pande appeared in the TV series MTV Fanaah and in music videos. Her second participation in cinema was in Dilwale, with the role of Jenny. In 2018, she participated in MTV's Ace of Space, but got evicted on 17 December. On 30 November 2018, she was cast on ALT Balaji's web series NIS.

Filmography

Television

Web series

Films

Music videos

References

External links 

 
 

Indian film actresses
Actresses from Dehradun
Actresses in Hindi cinema
Living people
21st-century Indian actresses
1989 births

Fear Factor: Khatron Ke Khiladi participants